The common interosseous artery, about 1 cm. in length, arises immediately below the tuberosity of the radius from the ulnar artery.

Passing backward to the upper border of the interosseous membrane, it divides into two branches, the anterior interosseous and posterior interosseous arteries.

Additional images

References

External links
 

Arteries of the upper limb